The Arras Open Senior Hauts de France is a men's senior (over 50) professional golf tournament on the European Senior Tour. It was held for the first time in June 2019 at Arras Golf Resort, Anzin-Saint-Aubin near Arras, France. Prize money was €200,000.

Winners

References

External links
Coverage on the European Senior Tour's official site

European Senior Tour events
Golf tournaments in France
Recurring sporting events established in 2019
2019 establishments in France